The Rotax 532 is a  two-stroke, two-cylinder, rotary valve engine, liquid-cooled, gear reduction-drive engine that was formerly manufactured by BRP-Rotax GmbH & Co. KG. It was designed for use on ultralight aircraft.

Design

The 532 features liquid-cooled cylinder heads and cylinders with a rotary valve inlet. Cooling is via one or two externally mounted radiators. Lubrication is by use of pre-mixed fuel and oil at 50:1. The 532 has a single Bosch flywheel magneto ignition system. It can be equipped with either one or two piston-type carburetors. It uses a manifold-driven pneumatic fuel pump to provide fuel pressure.

The engine's propeller drive is via a Rotax type B or C style gearbox. The standard engine includes a muffler exhaust system and an intake air filter. The standard starter is a recoil start type, with an electric starter optional. An integral alternating current generator produces 12 volts.

The Rotax 532 was replaced in production by the improved Rotax 582 engine design. The 582 increased the cylinder bore from the 532's 72 mm to 76 mm. This increased the displacement from 521.2 cc to 580.7 cc, an increase of 11%. The increased displacement had the effect of flattening out the 532's torque curve and allowed the 582 to produce useful power over a wider rpm range. Reliability over the 532 was also improved.

Applications

Specifications (Rotax 532)

See also
Rotax aircraft engines
Arrow 500

References

Two-stroke aircraft piston engines
Rotax engines